The 2020 Oman Tri-Nation Series was the fourth round of the 2019–2023 ICC Cricket World Cup League 2 cricket tournament and took place in Oman in January 2020. It was a tri-nation series between Oman, Namibia and the United Arab Emirates cricket teams, with the matches played as One Day International (ODI) fixtures. The ICC Cricket World Cup League 2 formed part of the qualification pathway to the 2023 Cricket World Cup.

After the first three ODIs, each team had won one match. The UAE then beat Namibia by eight wickets in the fourth match of the series.

Oman's match against the UAE on 11 January 2020 was cancelled following the death of Qaboos bin Said, the Sultan of Oman, who had died the previous day. The International Cricket Council (ICC) also confirmed that the final match of the series, between Oman and Namibia, would also not go ahead, with points not awarded for the two abandoned matches. The ICC looked at the possibility of playing the two matches at a later date, with the fixtures included in the 8th round of the tournament in November and December 2021.

Squads

Zahoor Khan withdrew from the UAE's squad following the death of his mother. Mohammad Ayaz was named as his replacement.

Fixtures

1st ODI

2nd ODI

3rd ODI

4th ODI

5th ODI

6th ODI

References

External links
 Series home at ESPN Cricinfo

2020 in Omani cricket
2020 in Namibian cricket
2020 in Emirati cricket
International cricket competitions in 2019–20
Oman
January 2020 sports events in Asia